Minuscule 551 (in the Gregory-Aland numbering), ε 251 (in the Soden numbering), is a Greek minuscule manuscript of the New Testament, on parchment. Palaeographically it has been assigned to the 12th century. 
Scrivener labeled it by number 538.

Description 

The codex contains a complete text of the four Gospels on 233 parchment leaves (size ). The writing is in one column per page, 22-23 lines per page.

There is a division according to the Ammonian Sections, and some references to the Eusebian Canons.

There are barbarous headpieces to the Gospels.

Text 

The Greek text of the codex is a representative of the Byzantine text-type. Aland placed it in Category V.
According to the Claremont Profile Method it represents the textual family Kx in Luke 1, Luke 10, and Luke 20.

History 

The manuscript was held in the Karakalou monastery at Athos peninsula. In 1837 Robert Curzon, Lord Zouche, brought this manuscript to England (along with the codices 547-550). The entire collection of Curzon was bequeathed by his daughter in 1917 to the British Museum, where it had been deposited, by his son, since 1876.

The manuscripts was added to the list of the New Testament minuscule manuscripts by F. H. A. Scrivener (538) and C. R. Gregory (551). Gregory saw it in 1883.

The manuscript was examined by Scrivener, Dean Burgon, and Gregory.

It is currently housed at the British Library (Add MS 39594) in London.

See also 

 List of New Testament minuscules
 Biblical manuscript
 Textual criticism

References

Further reading 
 S. Emmel, Catalogue of Materials for Writing, Early Writings on Tablets and Stones, rolled and other Manuscripts and Oriental Manuscript Books, in the Library of the Honourable Robert Curzon (London 1849).

External links 

Greek New Testament minuscules
12th-century biblical manuscripts
British Library additional manuscripts